Federal Street is a street in the Financial District of Boston, Massachusetts. Prior to 1788, it was known as Long Lane. The street was renamed after state leaders met there in 1788 to determine Massachusetts' ratification of the United States Constitution.

History

In 1727 the Long Lane Meeting House was established; it changed its name to the Federal Street Church in 1788. Henry Knox was born on Long Lane in 1750. The Federal Street Theatre was built in 1793, designed by Charles Bulfinch; it remained until 1852.

By 1806, residents included engraver Joseph Callender; printer Nathaniel Coverly; merchant Stephen Higginson; comedian Snelling Powell; dancing master William Turner. In 1823, residents included the Federal Street Coffee House; hairdresser William Lenox; Esther Newell and her "female intelligence office;" grocer Henry Sweetser; seamstress Martha Vincent. Dorothy Quincy and John Mackay also lived on Federal St. in the early 19th-century. Auctioneer J.L. Cunningham worked from Corinthian Hall, 1826-1843. J. H. Bufford's Sons ran a lithography printing business in the 1870s.

In 1928 arose Boston's "first art deco skyscraper," the United Shoe Machinery Building. In 1929, the "art deco jewel" at 75 Federal Street was built. The Blue Cross/Blue Shield building, designed by Paul Rudolph was built 1957-1960. 150 Federal Street, designed by Hugh Stubbins Jr. was built in 1988.

Images

See also

 101 Federal Street
 Dewey Square
 Federal Street Church (Boston)
 Federal Street Theatre
 First National Bank Building (Boston, Massachusetts)
 Odeon, Boston
 One Federal Street
 Trans National Place
 United Shoe Machinery Corporation Building

References

External links

 Bostonian Society. Photo of United Shoe Machinery building, 160 Federal St. 
 Flickr. United Shoe Machinery building, 160 Federal St. Postcard
 Flickr. View of Boston from an upper floor, One Federal Street, 2006

Streets in Boston
History of Boston
Financial District, Boston